The Thomas Alva Edison Birthplace is a historic house museum at 9 Edison Drive in Milan, Ohio,  Built in 1841, it was the birthplace of American inventor Thomas Alva Edison (1847-1931), born on February 11, 1847. It was designated a National Historic Landmark in 1965, and was added to the National Register of Historic Places in 1966. It is now the Thomas Edison Birthplace Museum.

Description and history
The Thomas Alva Edison Birthplace is in a formerly residential (now a museum complex) area north of downtown Milan, on the west side of North Edison Drive.  It is a small -story brick building, with a gabled roof and two end chimneys.  The main facade is five bays wide, with the entrance at the center, topped by a four-light transom window.  The door and window openings are all headed by stone lintels.  The downstairs interior includes two parlors, a sitting room, and kitchen.  The sitting room, in which Edison was born, includes the bed in which is mother lay for the birth.  The upstairs attic level includes two more bedrooms.  The house is furnished with Edison family artifacts.

The house was built and designed by Samuel Edison in 1841, on land purchased by his wife, Nancy Elliott Edison.  His son Thomas was born here in 1847, and it remained the family home until 1854, when they moved to Port Huron, Michigan.  The young Edison's early youth in Milan appears to have been unremarkable, the most notorious incident being his burning down a barn, described by one biographer as a "glorious experiment".  The house was sold in 1854, but was repurchased by Edison's sister in 1894.  After Edison's death in 1937, his wife and daughter worked to transform the birthplace into a museum in his honor.

See also

National Register of Historic Places listings in Erie County, Ohio
List of National Historic Landmarks in Ohio

References

External links
 Edison Birthplace Museum website
 National Historic Landmark listing
 The History of Thomas Alva Edison

National Register of Historic Places in Erie County, Ohio
Houses on the National Register of Historic Places in Ohio
National Historic Landmarks in Ohio
Museums in Erie County, Ohio
Houses completed in 1841
Historic house museums in Ohio
Thomas Edison
Biographical museums in Ohio
Houses in Erie County, Ohio
Birthplaces of individual people